The South London Botanical Institute (SLBI) is an institution for the popularization of botany. It was founded in 1910 by Allan Octavian Hume, a former civil servant for the British Raj in India.

After returning from India to England in 1894, and after giving up ornithology, and turning vegetarian, Hume took an interest in British and European botany, and horticulture, which eventually led him to create the Institute in a large Victorian house in Norwood Road, Tulse Hill, South London, to provide an environment where anyone interested in plants, whether amateur or professional, could meet to develop their knowledge of botany.

The Institute has changed little since its founding, and is of interest to historians as well as botanists. It contains the original library with an extensive collection of botanical books, monographs and journals and  herbarium with a collection of dried, pressed plants from Britain and Europe, mounted on sheets accompanied by collecting details, to help members name or identify plants correctly.  The lecture room was renovated and restored in 2015, including some unique wallpaper designed by Augusta Ackerman. There is an active programme of talks, practical courses, and field excursions.

It maintains a small botanic garden containing examples of over 500 species.

References

External links
 The Institute's official website

Botanical gardens in London
Charities based in London